Sergei Postrekhin (born November 1, 1957 in Kherson, Ukrainian SSR) is a Soviet-born Ukrainian sprint canoer who competed in the late 1970s and early 1980s. At the 1980 Summer Olympics in Moscow, he won a gold in the C-1 500 m event and a silver in the C-1 1000 m event.

Postrekhin also won three medals at the ICF Canoe Sprint World Championships with a gold (C-1 500 m: 1979) and two bronzes (C-1 500 m: 1982, C-2 1000 m: 1978).

References

Sports-reference.com profile

1957 births
Canoeists at the 1980 Summer Olympics
Living people
Soviet male canoeists
Ukrainian male canoeists
Olympic canoeists of the Soviet Union
Olympic gold medalists for the Soviet Union
Olympic silver medalists for the Soviet Union
Olympic medalists in canoeing
ICF Canoe Sprint World Championships medalists in Canadian
Sportspeople from Kherson
Medalists at the 1980 Summer Olympics